Amasa Norcross (January 26, 1824 – April 2, 1898) was a U.S. Representative from Massachusetts.

Born in Rindge, New Hampshire, Norcross attended the common schools and Appleton Academy, New Ipswich, New Hampshire. He studied law, was admitted to the bar in 1847 and commenced practice in Worcester, Massachusetts. He served as member of the Massachusetts House of Representatives in 1858, 1859, and again in 1862. He was assessor of internal revenue from August 1862 until May 1873, when the office was abolished.  He served as mayor of the city of Fitchburg, Massachusetts, in 1873 and 1874. He served in the Massachusetts Senate in 1874.

Norcross was elected as a Republican to the Forty-fifth, Forty-sixth, and Forty-seventh Congresses (March 4, 1877 – March 3, 1883). He was not a candidate for renomination in 1882.  He resumed the practice of law.  He died in Paris, France, April 2, 1898, while on a visit to his daughter, painter Eleanor Norcross. He was interred in Laurel Hill Cemetery, Fitchburg, Massachusetts.

See also

 1874 Massachusetts legislature
 Massachusetts House of Representatives' 6th Worcester district

References

External links
 

1824 births
1898 deaths
People from Rindge, New Hampshire
Politicians from Worcester, Massachusetts
Mayors of places in Massachusetts
Republican Party members of the Massachusetts House of Representatives
Republican Party Massachusetts state senators
Massachusetts lawyers
Republican Party members of the United States House of Representatives from Massachusetts
Politicians from Fitchburg, Massachusetts
19th-century American politicians
19th-century American lawyers